The canton of Lens-Nord-Ouest  is a former canton situated in the department of the Pas-de-Calais and in the Nord-Pas-de-Calais region of northern France. It was disbanded following the French canton reorganisation which came into effect in March 2015. It had a total of 16,928 inhabitants (2012).

Geography 
The canton is organised around Lens in the arrondissement of Lens. The altitude varies from 27m (Lens) to 74m (Loos-en-Gohelle) for an average altitude of 33m.

The canton comprised 2 communes:
Loos-en-Gohelle
Lens (partly)

See also 
Cantons of Pas-de-Calais 
Communes of Pas-de-Calais 
Arrondissements of the Pas-de-Calais department

References

Lens-Nord-Ouest
Lens, Pas-de-Calais
2015 disestablishments in France
States and territories disestablished in 2015